Jeon Jin-cheol (born 16 September 1967) is a South Korean boxer. He competed at the 1988 Summer Olympics and the 1992 Summer Olympics.

References

1967 births
Living people
South Korean male boxers
Olympic boxers of South Korea
Boxers at the 1988 Summer Olympics
Boxers at the 1992 Summer Olympics
Place of birth missing (living people)
Boxers at the 1990 Asian Games
Asian Games bronze medalists for South Korea
Asian Games medalists in boxing
Medalists at the 1990 Asian Games
Light-welterweight boxers